Welsh actor, author, producer, and director Anthony Hopkins has been acting since 1960. Between then and the 1970s, he appeared in the films The Lion in Winter (1968), Hamlet (1969), Young Winston (1972), Audrey Rose (1977) and playing Col. Frost in A Bridge Too Far (1977). In the 1980s, he had a starring role in the 1980 film The Elephant Man as Dr. Frederick Treves, opposite John Hurt and in the 1987 film 84 Charing Cross Road with Anne Bancroft.

In 1991, he was cast in the role of Dr. Hannibal Lecter in The Silence of the Lambs with Jodie Foster, a role he played again in Hannibal (2001) and the prequel Red Dragon (2002). For his role in The Silence of the Lambs, he won an Academy Award and BAFTA Film Award for Best Actor. Other notable roles he had during the 1990s were Bram Stoker's Dracula with Gary Oldman (1992), Chaplin with Robert Downey Jr. (1992), The Remains of the Day with Emma Thompson (1993), Legends of the Fall with Brad Pitt (1994), The Mask of Zorro with Antonio Banderas (1998), and Meet Joe Black again with Pitt (1998). The 2000s saw him in the films The World's Fastest Indian (2005), Fracture (2007), The Wolfman (2010), and The Rite (2011). In 2011 he co-starred with Chris Hemsworth as the Norse God Odin in the Marvel Studios film Thor (2011), then again for its 2013 sequel and the third film in 2017. Also in 2017, Hopkins played the role of Sir Edmund Burton, who was the last living member of a secret society of famed historical figures, the Order of Witwiccans, in Transformers: The Last Knight.

Hopkins has had numerous roles where he plays real life people including Richard Hauptmann in The Lindbergh Kidnapping Case (1976), C. S. "Jack" Lewis in Shadowlands (1993), Dr. John Harvey Kellogg in The Road to Wellville (1994), Richard Nixon in Nixon (1995), Pablo Picasso in Surviving Picasso (1996), John Quincy Adams in Amistad (1997), Alfred Hitchcock in Hitchcock (2012), and Pope Benedict XVI in The Two Popes (2019). For his roles in Nixon and Amistad he was nominated for an Academy Award.

His television work includes appearances in QB VII (1974), All Creatures Great and Small (1975), Hollywood Wives (1985), and Great Expectations (1991). In 2015, he starred in the BBC television film The Dresser, and from 2016 to 2018, he starred in the HBO television series Westworld.

Film

Television

Theatre

Music videos

See also

References

External links
 

Male actor filmographies
British filmographies
Director filmographies